National Route 186 is a national highway of Japan connecting Gōtsu, Shimane and Ōtake, Hiroshima in Japan, with a total length of 145.5 km (90.41 mi).

References

National highways in Japan
Roads in Hiroshima Prefecture
Roads in Shimane Prefecture